The Honda HA-420 HondaJet is a light business jet produced by the Honda Aircraft Company of Greensboro, North Carolina, United States.

Original concepts of the aircraft started in 1997 and were completed in 1999.
It took its maiden flight on December 3, 2003, received its FAA type certificate in December 2015, and was first delivered that same month.
By the end of 2021, 200 jets had been delivered.

The seven- to eight-seat aircraft has a composite fuselage and an aluminum wing and is powered by two GE Honda HF120 turbofans unusually mounted on pylons above the wing.

The HondaJet has received several aeronautic design and innovation accolades.

Development

Honda began to study small-sized business jets in the late 1980s, using engines from other manufacturers. The Honda MH01 turboprop used an all-composite construction, and the Honda MH02 was fabricated and assembled at Mississippi State University's Raspet Flight Research Laboratory in the late 1980s and early 1990s. The MH02 was a prototype using carbon fiber/epoxy composite materials and was the first all-composite light business jet to fly. Flight testing on the MH02 continued through 1996, after which the aircraft was shipped to Japan.

Designer and company founder, Michimasa Fujino, began sketching the HondaJet in 1997, and the concept was solidified in 1999. According to Fujino, design of the HondaJet nose was inspired by Salvatore Ferragamo shoes. Testing in the Boeing windtunnel indicated a valid concept in 1999.

In October 2000, Honda R&D Americas established a research facility at the Piedmont Triad International Airport in Greensboro, North Carolina On December 3, 2003, a proof-of-concept HondaJet conducted its first successful test flight at the Greensboro facility. At this point, Honda executives remained unsure about whether or not to commercialize the HondaJet program. To better understand the commercial potential of the HondaJet,  Fujino publicly displayed the HondaJet for the first time on July 28, 2005, at the annual EAA AirVenture Oshkosh airshow. The debut attracted strong interest, and convinced Honda executives to commercialize the HondaJet, which Honda publicly announced at the following year's AirVenture.

In 2006, Honda announced the commercialization of the jet with a first delivery then planned for 2010. At the time, pricing was set at $3.65 million. The first FAA-conforming (built to Federal Aviation Administration rules) HondaJet achieved its first flight on 20 December 2010. The first flight of the first production HondaJet occurred on June 27, 2014, and it was displayed at that year's AirVenture on July 28. Four HondaJets had test-flown 2,500 hours .

The HondaJet was awarded a provisional type certificate by the FAA in March 2015.  This enabled continued production and demonstration flights, including a HondaJet tour in Japan and Europe in 2015. The aircraft received its FAA type certificate in December 2015, and received its European Aviation Safety Agency (EASA) type certificate in May 2016. The HondaJet was also certified in Japan in December 2018.

Estimates for Honda's investment into the Hondajet program range from one to 1.5-2 billion dollars.

Production

The production aircraft are built at Piedmont Triad International Airport. Construction of the factory began in 2007 and was completed in late 2011. In early 2015, there were 12 aircraft in final assembly and five more in earlier stages of production. Twenty aircraft were in production by May 2015. Honda estimated it would produce 40 aircraft in the first full year and up to 60 each year after that. The engine factory achieved certification in March 2015.

Honda delivered the first customer aircraft on December 23, 2015, at its world headquarters in Greensboro, North Carolina. The first delivery of a HondaJet to a European aircraft dealer took place in April 2016. About 20% of the first 100 aircraft ordered were destined for European customers, according to coverage in April 2016.

Honda planned to ramp up production to 80 units per year after March 2019. Sixteen aircraft were delivered in the first three quarters of 2016, reaching a 36-per-year production rate. In 2017, 15 were produced in the first quarter, and the annual target is between 55 and 60 aircraft. After deliveries began in late 2015, the HondaJet soon became one of the top-selling aircraft in its class.

In July 2019, Honda Aircraft began construction of a new $15.5 million, 82,000-square-foot wing assembly center on its campus. The new facility, which is meant to enhance production efficiently by allowing wings to be assembled concurrently, was opened in September 2020.

HondaJet Elite

In May 2018, the $5.2 million (as of 2018) HondaJet Elite was revealed, with an expanded performance envelope, improved interior  and updated flight deck.  The type certificate was amended by the FAA on 2 May  2018, and soon followed by EASA. Honda began deliveries on August 7, 2018.

The horizontal stabilizer tips are extended slightly and hinge gaps tightened up, allowing energized flow over the stabilizer without its vortex generators. A new engine inlet reduces vibration and cabin noise, the lavatory receives a belted seat allowing a fifth passenger even with a galley; avionics improvements with Garmin G3000-based flight deck include takeoff and landing (TOLD) calculations, angle of attack protection, and Flight Stream 510 functionality.

In October 2019, Honda Aircraft Company presented first medevac-configured HondaJet Elite for air ambulance use. In the same month, a HondaJet Elite flew to the 2019 National Business Aviation Association meeting using sustainable aviation fuel. Also in 2019, HondaJet received type certification in China, Canada, and Turkey.
By then, its unit cost was US$5.28 million.

In 2020, EASA certified HondaJet Elite for steep approaches (descent angles of up to 5.5°), and for up to 8 occupants.
In May 2021, the MTOW of the Elite S was raised by 91 kg (200 lb).
In 2022, its equipped price was $5.75M.

HondaJet APMG 
To retrofit some of the upgrades of HondaJet Elite to pre-Elite HondaJets, an APMG (Advanced Performance Modification Group) upgrade is available for $250,000. Avionics upgrades include takeoff and landing (TOLD) calculations, Flight Stream 510 wireless gateway compatibility, an enhanced electronic checklist, angle-of-attack indicator on the PFD, and visual approaches. On the other hand, HondaJet Elite features such as an additional fuel tank or engine inlet acoustic improvement, are not available with APMG.

HondaJet 2600

With a double club seating, the HondaJet 2600 concept is intended for testing the market to assess demand before deciding to launch the program.

HondaJet Elite II

It has a Garmin G3000 integrated flight deck, autothrottles from the first half of 2023 and a Garmin emergency autoland later on in 2023. It features a new paint scheme and redesigned interior. FAA certification was expected in late 2022.

Design

The HondaJet is a low-wing monoplane that uses a composite fuselage and an aluminum wing.
It belongs to the very light jet category.

It uses two engines mounted on pylons above the wing, a configuration called Over-The-Wing Engine Mount, or OTWEM, by Honda Aircraft. This configuration maximizes cabin space by removing the structure required to mount engines on the rear of the fuselage. A similar over-wing engine configuration was used in the 1970s on the VFW-Fokker 614, but had limited the aircraft's speed due to interference between the engine and the wing. This, along with the overall commercial failure of the VFW-Fokker 614, made the over-wing configuration unpopular with aircraft designers. To avoid these issues, the HondaJet's designer used computer analysis and wind tunnel testing to find the optimal position for engine placement on top of the wings, which was determined to be at 75 percent of the wing chord. The HondaJet's engines are positioned in such a way that the airflow over the wing is superimposed with the airflow around the engine to minimize wave drag at high speed. The HondaJet designer calls this “favorable interference.” This configuration not only eliminated the problems associated with earlier over-wing engine mounts, but actually reduced wave drag compared to a conventional rear-fuselage mounted configuration. OTWEM configuration is often named the most unusual feature of the HondaJet.

The nose and wing are designed for laminar flow, and the main fuselage has a constant profile, making an eventual stretch easier. The combination of engine placement, wing and fuselage was achieved using computer simulations and wind tunnels. The HondaJet has a retractable tricycle landing gear with both main and nose landing gear single-wheeled.

The aircraft is powered by two GE Honda HF120 turbofans, developed with GE Aviation under the GE-Honda partnership. Honda began developing its own small turbofan engine, the HF118, in 1999, leading to the HF120. The HF120 was test-flown on a Cessna Citation CJ1. The engine features a single fan, a two-stage compressor and a two-stage turbine. The GE Honda HF120 received FAA type certification on 13 December 2013, and production certification in 2015.

Honda claims that the combination of lightweight materials, aerodynamics and efficient engines gave the HondaJet up to 20% better fuel efficiency than similar aircraft.

The aircraft is equipped with a touchscreen 3-display Garmin G3000 glass cockpit system.

Accolades
Michimasa Fujino received the Business & Commercial Aviation - Vision Award (2008),
the AIAA - Aircraft Design Award (2012),
the SAE International - Clarence L. (Kelly) Johnson Aerospace Vehicle Design and Development Award (2013),
the 2014 ICAS award  for Innovation in Aeronautics for leading the design, the Living Legends of Aviation Industry Leader of the Year award, as well as the 2021 AIAA Reed Aeronautics Award.

The HondaJet was included in the Robb Report - Best of the Best : Business Jets (2007),
in the Aviation Week & Space Technology - Techs To Watch (2010), in the 2014 'Best of What's New' by Popular Science magazine, the Flying Magazine - Flying Innovation Award in 2017, and the AIN 2021 ‘Top Flight’ Awards. The Honda Aircraft Company received the AIAA Foundation Award for Excellence in 2018.

Operational history
HondaJet has an ICAO designator HDJT. As of December 2021, the 200 HondaJet aircraft in service have logged 98,000 hours with a 99.7% dispatch reliability.

The HA-420 was involved in one hull-loss accident with no injuries.

Specifications (Elite)

Deliveries

Deliveries slowed in 2018 because of a combination of the transition to the HondaJet Elite, timing of fleet deliveries and customers' schedules. In 2020, they slowed again due to the COVID-19 pandemic.

See also

References

External links

 
 
 
 

HA-420
2000s Japanese business aircraft
2000s United States business aircraft
Very light jets
Twinjets
Engine-over-wing aircraft
T-tail aircraft
Aircraft first flown in 2003